Thomas Mildmay (1515 – 21 September 1566), was an English politician, sheriff, and judicial officer. 

He was born in Moulsham, Essex and London, the eldest son of Thomas Mildmay of Chelmsford, Essex.

From 1541 until his death, he was Justice of the peace for Essex. From 1558–1559, he was appointed High Sheriff of Essex and Hertfordshire. He was elected a Member of Parliament for Bodmin in October 1553, Lostwithiel in 1559 and Helston in 1547, Mar. 1553, 1555 and 1558.

He married Avis, the daughter of William Gonson of London, and had 8 sons and 7 daughters.

References

1566 deaths
People from Chelmsford
Politicians from London
Year of birth uncertain
Members of the Parliament of England for Bodmin
English MPs 1553 (Mary I)
English MPs 1555
English MPs 1558
English MPs 1559
English MPs 1547–1552
High Sheriffs of Essex
High Sheriffs of Hertfordshire
Members of the Parliament of England for Lostwithiel
Members of the Parliament of England for Helston
English justices of the peace
Thomas